Tavares is a Portuguese surname. The Spanish version of this name is Tavarez. This surname was adopted by Sephardic Jews as well.

Notable people with the surname

General
Alda Bandeira Tavares Vaz da Conceição (born 1949), São Toméan politician
António Raposo Tavares (1598–1658), Portuguese explorer and bandeirante
Aureliano Cândido Tavares Bastos (1839–1875), Brazilian politician, writer and journalist
Aurélio de Lyra Tavares, Brazilian general
Carlos Tavares (born 1958), Portuguese businessman
Charmaine Tavares (born 1943), American politician
Chelsea Tavares, American actress and singer
Gonçalo M. Tavares (born 1970), Portuguese writer
Eugénio Tavares (1867–1930), Cape Verdean writer
Fernanda Tavares (born 1980), Brazilian supermodel
Freddie Tavares (1913–1990), American musician and inventor
Horace Ward Martin Tavares Silver, United States musician and composer
Kibwe Tavares, British film maker and architect
Miguel Sousa Tavares (born 1952), Portuguese journalist and writer
Patrícia Tavares (born 1977), Portuguese actress
Rui Tavares (born 1972), Portuguese politician
Stafford Tavares, Canadian cryptographer
Tatiana Silva Braga Tavares, Belgian model
Urbano Tavares Rodrigues (1923–2013), Portuguese writer and journalist

Sports
André Luiz Tavares (born 1983), Brazilian footballer
Brad Tavares (born 1987), American mixed martial arts fighter
Clodoaldo Tavares de Santana, Brazilian footballer
Diogo Tavares (born 1987), Portuguese footballer
D'Jamila Tavares (born 1994), São Tomé and Príncipe runner
Jimmy Tavares (born 1984), French figure skater and actor
John Tavares (ice hockey) (born 1990), Canadian ice hockey player
John Tavares (lacrosse) (born 1968),Canadian lacrosse player
Marcos Tavares (born 1984), Brazilian footballer
Manuel José Tavares Fernandes, Portuguese footballer and manager
Mickaël Tavares (born 1982), Senegalese footballer
Mikoyam Tavares (born 1981), Cape Verdean-Portuguese footballer
Nuno Tavares (born 2000), Portuguese footballer
Stopira (born 1988), real name Ianique Santos Tavares, Cape Verdean footballer basketball player
Thiago Tavares (born 1984), Brazilian martial arts fighter
Tony Tavares, American sports executive
Walter Tavares (born 1992), Cape Verdean basketball player

Portuguese-language surnames